Eshaqvand may refer to:
 Eshaqvand-e Olya
 Eshaqvand-e Sofla